Üçyol is a village in the Hasankeyf District of Batman Province in Turkey. The village is populated by Kurds of both non-tribal affiliation and the Erebiyan tribe. It had a population of 415 in 2021.

The hamlet of Kavak is attached to the village.

References 

Villages in Hasankeyf District
Kurdish settlements in Batman Province